George Lyall (1800s) was a co-founder of the Lyall, Still & Co. and a member of the Legislative Council of Hong Kong.

Lyall founded Lyall, Still & Co with Charles Fredrick Still in Hong Kong. He was appointed an unofficial member in Legislative Council in 1857. After Joseph Jardine retired in 1860, he became the Senior Unofficial Member. He resigned later that year.

In 1866, his company ran into legal issue involving Bill of lading violation with shipment from London to Hong Kong. The case appealed to Supreme Court of Hong Kong and was dismissed by Queen Victoria.

References

Members of the Legislative Council of Hong Kong
Hong Kong people of British descent
19th-century British businesspeople
Year of birth missing
Year of death missing